The Right Person is a 1957 Australian television play. It was made at a time when Australian drama production was rare.

It was filmed in ABC's Melbourne studios.

Plot
A suspense play about three people faced with  events   from   the   past in   present-day Copenhagen.

Cast
Norman Griffiths
Laura James 
Carl Bleazby.

Production
The play had previously been shot for English television on the BBC and turned into a short film in 1955 made by Hammer Films.

John Peters, who designed the Australian production, had worked on the film in England. The play was shot in Melbourne with some insert scenes filmed at the Hotel Federal on Collins Street. Frank Few was the cameraman.

Eric McCleery also directed Holiday in Biarritz.

See also
List of live television plays broadcast on Australian Broadcasting Corporation (1950s)

References

External links

1950s Australian television plays
1957 television plays